The West Indies cricket team toured New Zealand from 6 February 1980 to 5 March 1980, playing 3 Tests and 1 One Day Internationals against New Zealand. The West Indies were coming after their first test series win on Australian soil. However, Vivian Richards who scored 400 runs in the Australian tour returned home with a sore back. As a result, New Zealand won the test series 1-0 as well as the only ODI by 1 wicket.

The series is remembered for West Indian complaints about the standard of umpiring, which led to a number of on-field incidents in the three Test matches. This series was the West Indies' last defeat in a Test match series until 1994–95.

First tour match

The West Indies' first game of the tour was against Northern Districts on 3 February 1980. The three-day match ended in a draw after the West Indies finished up on 132/8, chasing 153. Gordon Greenidge made 116 for the West Indies in the first innings, the only century of the match.

One-day international
The only limited overs match of the series was held on 6 February 1980.  A close game, New Zealand won by 1 wicket with two balls remaining.

Test series summary

First Test

The First Test was scheduled over 8–13 February.  The West Indies won the toss and elected to bat, where they made 140, Richard Hadlee taking 5-34 for New Zealand.  New Zealand, braving the West Indies' renowned four-man pace attack, made 249 in their innings, a lead of 109.  105 from Desmond Haynes ensured New Zealand had to bat again, but the target of 104 appeared to be too little for the West Indies to defend.  Nevertheless, determined bowling by the West Indies took the game to the wire, with New Zealand at one stage reduced to 54/7.  New Zealand eventually won by one wicket after their number 10 and 11 batsmen scored the winning runs off a leg bye.  The exciting finish was overshadowed, however, by West Indian complaints of poor umpiring throughout the match.  Michael Holding had kicked the stumps in frustration after having an appeal turned down in New Zealand's second innings, an action which was assured of worldwide attention when it was captured by a newspaper photographer at the grounds.  After the match, the West Indies' manager, Willie Rodriguez, complained, "We got two men out and they were not given. They were atrocious decisions."

The West Indies then played their second tour match against Wellington on 16 February.  The low-scoring game was won by Wellington by 6 wickets.

Second Test

The Second Test was held over 22–27 February.  The match ended in a draw with the West Indies on 447/5 in their second innings, a lead of 215 after having been behind by 232 in the first innings.  The match was more renowned for tensions between the West Indians and the New Zealand umpires coming to a head.  At tea on the third day, the West Indies refused to return to the field until the New Zealand umpire Fred Goodall was replaced.  After being convinced by New Zealand captain Geoff Howarth to return to the field, the West Indians resumed play after a 12-minute delay.  Nevertheless, the West Indians began packing their bags after the day's play with the apparent intention of abandoning the Test and series and returning home.  This option was forbidden, however, by the chairman of the West Indian Cricket Board, Jeff Stollmeyer.  On the fourth day, West Indian anger again spilled over when bowler Colin Croft shoulder-barged Goodall in his run-up; when Goodall complained to Lloyd, Lloyd made Goodall walk up to him by not moving from his position in the slips.  Croft and Lloyd maintained after the series that the shoulder-barging had been an accident, although New Zealand captain Howarth disputed this.

Third Test

The third and final Test of the series was held over 29 February to 5 March.  Again ending in a draw, New Zealand were left on 73/4 chasing 180 at stumps on the fifth day.  While not reaching the heights of the Second Test, the match was still marred by some controversy when four senior West Indian players indicated that they would be catching flights home at lunch on the final day, substitute fielders taking their places for the remaining sessions.  The players involved were persuaded out of this action.

Aftermath
What was from a spectator's perspective a remarkable series—a closely fought 1-0 victory by lowly New Zealand against the then unofficial cricket world champions—was marred by acrimony and complaints from the teams involved.  The West Indies maintained their bitterness towards the umpiring after the series, with Rodriguez complaining that the umpiring had not been biased so much as incompetent and that the West Indies had been "set up; that there was no way we could win a Test."  Lloyd later conceded, however, that he should have taken a firmer line with his players and that some of the incidents had not been in the best interests of the game.  New Zealand's Goodall, however—the principal target of the West Indies' anger—compounded the bitterness by allegedly making racist comments about the West Indies at an after-dinner speech following the series.

Cricket-wise, the series was a watershed for both teams—the West Indies would go on to establish a record unbeaten run in Test match series until 1994–95, while the victory heralded the emergence of New Zealand's best Test team.

References

External sources
Cricinfo tour directory

1980 in West Indian cricket
1980 in New Zealand cricket
International cricket competitions from 1975–76 to 1980
New Zealand cricket seasons from 1970–71 to 1999–2000
1979-80